Eisendrath is a surname. Notable people with the surname include:
Charles Eisendrath (born 1940), American journalist
Edwin Eisendrath (born 1958), American news media executive and politician
John Eisendrath, American television writer and producer
Maurice Eisendrath (1902–1973), American rabbi
Polly Young-Eisendrath (born 1947), American psychologist